Kristian Friis Petersen (17 September 1867 – 5 April 1932) was the Norwegian Minister of Social Affairs 1914–1916 and Minister of Trade 1916–1919.

Kristian became a student from Ålesund Latin School in 1886. In 1891 he attended a Candidate of Law degree and then attended the Sorenskriver in Søre Sunnmøre until he began a business in Ålesund in 1893. When his father was appointed foe in Romsdal that same year, he was one of the years appointed police chief in Ålesund.

From 1918 to 1929 he was County Governor of Hordaland.

References

1867 births
1932 deaths
Government ministers of Norway
Ministers of Trade and Shipping of Norway